Mortuary Chapel, Handsworth Cemetery is a Grade I listed chapel in the Church of England in Handsworth, Birmingham, England.

History

It was designed by the architect William Bidlake in the Arts and Crafts style. Work started in 1909 and it was consecrated in 1910.

The condition of the chapel deteriorated and English Heritage put it on their Buildings at Risk register.

In 2012 English Heritage awarded £375,000 toward the restoration of the chapel. Birmingham City Council, who operate the cemetery,  contributed another £325,000.

References

Church of England church buildings in Birmingham, West Midlands
Grade I listed churches in the West Midlands (county)
William Bidlake buildings
Churches completed in 1910
Arts and Crafts architecture in England
Grade I listed buildings in Birmingham